The men's road race H5 cycling event at the 2016 Summer Paralympics took place on September 17 at Pontal, Rio. Ten riders competed.

References

Men's road race H5